Immersion Corporation is an Aventura, Florida based developer and licensor of touch feedback technology, also known as haptic technology. Immersion Corporation has been accused of being a patent troll. Founded in 1993 by Louis Rosenberg, it is currently headed by lawyer Francis Jose, who serves as both chief executive officer and general counsel.

History

 In 1993, Immersion was founded by Louis Rosenberg, who served as its chief executive officer until 2000.
 In 1997, Immersion worked with Microsoft to integrate their Immersion's TouchSense technology into Microsoft's DirectInput API for DirectX 5.0. Microsoft and Immersion continued to work together on DirectX 6 and 7, and signed an agreement in 1999 to share each other's "feel simulation technology".
 In November 1999, the company went public. Shares were offered at $12.00.  
 In March 2000, Immersion acquired Haptic Technologies for $7 million, gaining their patent portfolio.
 In March 2000, Immersion acquired Immersion Medical for an undisclosed amount, gaining their patent portfolio.
 In September 2000, Immersion acquired Virtual Technologies for $1 million, gaining their patent portfolio.
 By 2014, Immersion Corporation gained over 1,650 issued or pending patents in the U.S. and other countries in the haptic field. 
 February 2016: Immersion claims Apple has infringed two patents on the iPhone 6s and new Apple Watch. The CEO of Immersion is seeking compensation from Apple and an injunction on US sales.
 January 2017: Immersion has a multi-year partnership with Nintendo to use its haptic technology on the Nintendo Switch.

Litigation

Sony and Microsoft

Meta Platforms
In May 2022, Immersion sued Meta Platforms for patent infringement relating to the use of vibration functions in their gaming controllers.

References

External links 
 

1999 initial public offerings
Companies based in Miami-Dade County, Florida
Companies listed on the Nasdaq
Electronics companies of the United States